William Eklund (born 12 October 2002) is a Swedish ice hockey forward playing with the San Jose Barracuda in the American Hockey League (AHL) as a prospect to the San Jose Sharks of the National Hockey League (NHL). Eklund is the son of retired ice hockey player Christian Eklund, who also played for Djurgården.

Playing career
Eklund made his debut in the Swedish Hockey League on 4 January 2020 playing for Djurgårdens IF in a 4–2 win away against IK Oskarshamn. He played a total of 20 regular season games and scoring two points during the rest of the 2019–20 SHL season. He collected five points in his first eight games in the 2020–21 SHL season. Considered the top international prospect for the 2021 NHL Entry Draft by NHL Central Scouting, he was selected seventh overall by the San Jose Sharks.

Eklund was signed by the Sharks to a three-year, entry-level contract on 16 August 2021. He made his NHL debut on 16 October 2021, in a 4–3 win over the Winnipeg Jets, where he also registered his first point, an assist. After playing nine games with the Sharks, he was reassigned back to Sweden on 5 November 2021. Eklund scored his first NHL goal on 14 March 2023, in a 6–5 overtime loss to the Columbus Blue Jackets.

International play
Eklund was named for the preliminary Swedish roster for the 2021 World Junior Ice Hockey Championships. He tested positive for COVID-19, preventing him from joining the final roster for the tournament.

Eklund made his debut with the Swedish national ice hockey team on 28 April 2021 in a friendly game against Denmark. He scored one goal and made one assist.

Career statistics

Regular season and playoffs

International

Awards and honors

References

External links

2002 births
Djurgårdens IF Hockey players
Living people
National Hockey League first-round draft picks
People from Haninge Municipality
San Jose Barracuda players
San Jose Sharks draft picks
San Jose Sharks players
Swedish ice hockey players
Sportspeople from Stockholm County